Cardboard Castles is the second studio album by American spoken word artist and rapper Watsky.  The album was released on March 12, 2013.  Unlike his debut album, entitled Watsky, there is a deluxe edition. The deluxe edition includes one extra song, and the CD case folds into a miniature "cardboard castle." Watsky also embarked on an American  tour to promote the album (some dates in Canada and the UK were also included). The album is also available on vinyl at request of his fans.

On March 5, one week before Cardboard Castles was released, Watsky leaked the album on Rap Genius.  This included the announcement of the deluxe edition bonus track, entitled Dent In The Moon.  Along with the leak, Rap Genius held a contest for the 'scholar' who explained the most lyrics on the album. The prize was two tickets to Watsky's concert at Irving Plaza in New York City.  The concert took place on March 30.

Throughout the album are various recordings of conversations Watsky has with child actor Norton Leufven.

Singles 

On January 22, 2013, Watsky released the first single from Cardboard Castles, entitled "Strong as an Oak," along with a music video. The video has gained over 7,210,319 view as of September 30, 2020.

On February 5, 2013, Watsky released the second single from Cardboard Castles, entitled "Moral of the Story," along with a music video. The video has gained over 10,706,309 views as of September 30, 2020.

On February 18, 2013, Watsky released the third single from Cardboard Castles, entitled "Hey, Asshole," featuring British singer Kate Nash. As with the first two singles, he released a music video, which has over 6,485,079 views as of September 30, 2020.

On February 24, 2013, Watsky leaked the audio for a song on Cardboard Castles, entitled "Sloppy Seconds" on kiisfm.com. The music video for "Sloppy Seconds" was later released on his YouTube page, April 21, 2013, and has gained over 12,629,324 views as of September 30, 2020.

On March 5, 2013, Watsky released the video for the only poem on the CD, entitled "Tiny Glowing Screens, Part 2" on his YouTube page. The video has gained over 2,709,018 views as of September 30, 2020.

On March 12, 2013, Watsky released the video for the song from which the album gets its name, "Cardboard Castles," on his YouTube page. This is the same day that the album was released. The video has gained over 4,097,513 views as of September 30, 2020.

Reception
Cardboard Castles has been received well by critics. Marianne Calnan of Sound And Motion Magazine reviewed it very favorably.

Track listing 

"Tiny Glowing Screens, Part 2" is the only poem on Cardboard Castles.

Personnel 

Executive Producers

 George Watsky
 Kush Mody

Engineers

 Nils Montan (also co-producer)

Producers

 Daniel J. W!shington (1, 16)
 Kush Mody (2, 4, 9, 10, 11, 15, 17) 
 Mikos (3, 4, 8, 12, 17)
 Max Miller-Loran (3, 4, 17) 
 Daniel Riera (6, 14)
 Aaron Carmack (7)

Mixing and Mastering

 Mike Denten at Infinite Studios
 Cardboard Castles (song) was mixed by David Boucher
 Jeff Sanger (Studio Assistant)
 Migui Maloles (Mix Assistant)
 Nils Montan (Sound Design on The Legend Of Hardhead Ned)

Additional Vocals

 Chinaka Hodge (Kill a Hipster)
 Kate Nash (Hey, Asshole)

Kate Nash recorded by: Stephen Good at Vatican Studios in London.
Kate Nash appears courtesy of Have 10p Records.

 Dylan Saunders (The Legend of Hardhead Ned)
 Norton Leufven (Fireworks, Ugly Faces, Skit #1, All I Need Is One, Skit #2 & Dent in the Moon) (Uncredited)
 Andrew Oedel (Kill a Hipster)

Choir (Cardboard Castles & Send In The Sun):

 Sylvia St. James
 Isabel Belloso
 Sue Massengale
 Alexandra Taylor
 Christy Lynch
 Danisha Johnson
 Chenelle Solomon
 Chris Bolton
 Patrick Bolton
 Ivan Hicks
 Marjanae Johnson
 Charlie Domingo

Musicians

 Chukwudi Hodge: Drums (1, 8, 9, 15) Buckets (2) Percussion (6)
 Kush Mody: Synth (1) Organ (1) Bells (3) Tambourine (6) Guitar (8) Organ (16)
 Max Miller-Loran: Trumpet (2, 6) Synth (9)
 Brandon Intelligator: Acoustic Guitar (2)
 George Watsky: Bells (2) Harmonica (2)
 Dave Skelly: Trombone (3)
 Crystal Alforque: Viola (3, 9, 10)
 Robin Ross: Viola (3, 9, 10, 15)
 Max Mueller: Cello (3, 9, 10, 15)
 Billy Tobenkin: Cello (3, 9, 10, 15)
 Andrew Oedel: Guitar (6, 9, 15)
 Owen Clapp: Bass (6, 8)
 Nils Montan: Piano (6)
 Pat Dimitri: Guitar (12)
 Charlie Domingo: Bass (17)

Art

 Illustrations by: [dadushin.com Dadu Shin]
 Art direction & layout by: Carrie Smith
 Castle photography: Alan Gwizdowski
 Catapult illustration: Jackson Adams

Recorded at The Mothership Studio, Los Angeles, with additional vocals recorded at Studio Sound City.

Cardboard Castles Tour 

Watsky embarked on a second nationwide tour, starting on March 8, 2013 in Tempe, AZ. Watsky has posted a video on his official youtube page stating how The Fillmore is his "dream, bucket-list venue"  and how excited he is for the tour.

All dates marked with an * are with rapper Dumbfoundead.

References 

2013 albums
George Watsky albums